Laredo International Bridge 5 (nicknamed the South Laredo International Bridge) is a proposed bridge to be built on the U.S.-Mexico border between the southern portion of Webb County, Texas, and Nuevo Laredo, Tamaulipas.

, there are three potential locations being considered for the bridge, all several miles south of the existing bridges in Laredo:

 Webb County officials favor a site on Mangana-Hein Road in southern Laredo.
 The city of Laredo favors a site approximately a mile south of Mangana-Hein Road, also in southern Laredo.
 A group of private landowners have promised to donate land for a site between Rio Bravo and El Cenizo, south of the Laredo city limits.

City and county officials at a meeting on May 8, 2008 set a self-imposed six-week deadline for deciding on a preferred site for the bridge.  Past disputes between the city and county over ownership of the bridge appear to have been largely resolved.

Construction of the South Laredo International Bridge is expected to occur in the next several years once the World Trade International Bridge reaches full capacity.  In preparation for the bridge and to accommodate urban growth in south Laredo, extensive construction on U.S. Highway 83, including a creation of a median, widening, and an interchange with flyovers with State Highway 359 on US 83, has been undertaken.

Sources
City of Laredo
Webb County
May 23, 2007 Update

References

International bridges in Laredo, Texas
Proposed bridges in the United States
Road bridges in Texas